Coimbatore District Textile Workers Union, a trade union in the textile industry in Coimbatore District, Tamil Nadu, India. CDTWU is affiliated to the Hind Mazdoor Sabha. The general secretary of CDTWU is A. Subramaniam and the president is Rajamani (state secretary of HMS).

Trade unions in India
Hind Mazdoor Sabha-affiliated unions
Textile and clothing trade unions
Economy of Coimbatore
Textile industry in Tamil Nadu